Marc Louis Ecko (né Milecofsky; August 29, 1972) is an American fashion designer, entrepreneur, and artist. He is the founder and Chief Creative Officer of fashion company Ecko Unlimited. He also founded Complex magazine in 2002.

Early life 
Milecofsky was born in New Jersey on August 29, 1972. He was brought up with his twin Marci and an older sister, Shari, in suburban Lakewood, New Jersey, where his father was a pharmacist and his mother was a real estate broker. In 1996, Milecofsky legally changed his name to Ecko; he had intended to use "Echo", a name he was known by at home, but since he wanted to build a brand out of the name and the name "Echo" was already taken, he settled on the alternate spelling.

Ecko entered Rutgers University's School of Pharmacy in New Brunswick, New Jersey after high school. During his time in college he painted graffiti and practiced drawing, taking "Ecko" for his name. In his third year, the school's dean encouraged Ecko to take a year off and pursue art.

Career 
In 1993, Ecko started Ecko Unltd. as a T-shirt company, with small investments from his sister and a friend, Seth Gerszberg. He traveled to Hong Kong to learn about the clothing industry. Early clients Spike Lee and Chuck D helped bring attention to his fledgling business, as did a Good Morning America segment that featured his T-shirt designs. The company expanded further into hip-hop and skater styles, and began to sport a rhinoceros logo.

Ecko's businesses have expanded to include  Complex magazine, video and social gaming, and venture capital.

Ecko was appointed to the Board of Directors of the Council of Fashion Designers of America (CFDA); the youngest designer to do so. Since 2010, he has been a member of the Emeritus Board.

In 2008, he created the new jackets for the Iron Chefs on Iron Chef America.

Personal life 
Ecko is Jewish. In 2000, Ecko married Allison Rojas. They have three children and live in Bernardsville, New Jersey.

In 2011, Ecko started Unlimited Justice, a social activism campaign which opposed corporal punishment in U.S. schools.

He has supported a number of charities and organisations, including raising money for the Tikva Children's Home in Odessa, Ukraine.

Published work 
On October 1, 2013, Ecko released an autobiographical business book, Unlabel: Selling You Without Selling Out, which offers advice on entrepreneurship and personal branding.

See also 
 Marc Ecko's Getting Up: Contents Under Pressure

References 

1972 births
Living people
Artists from New Jersey
American businesspeople in retailing
American fashion businesspeople
American fashion designers
American investors
Businesspeople from New Jersey
Jewish American philanthropists
Jewish fashion designers
People from Bernardsville, New Jersey
People from East Brunswick, New Jersey
People from Lakewood Township, New Jersey
People from Livingston, New Jersey
Rutgers University alumni
Lakewood High School (New Jersey) alumni
21st-century American Jews